This is the discography of American DJ Getter.

Studio albums

Extended plays

Singles

SoundCloud discography

References

Discographies of American artists